Manodu is a 2006 Indian Telugu film directed by Priyadarshini Ram. It is the first film directed by Priyadarshini Ram. The film was released on 24 February 2006. The director Priyadarshini won Nandi Special Jury Award for this film.

Plot
The film narrates the story of a young man Viswam (Bharat) who rises from utter poverty to riches, by unfair means like charging commission from creditors for recovering their loans, though advised against it by his parents and friends. All that he treats as important is money and thinks that there is nothing he cannot achieve with money. Saying so, he walks out of home. What kind of problems he and his like-minded friends face is the subject of the film. These friends work under the leadership of one Raghu (Priyadarshini Ram). Obviously they are in a 'dandha', a name often used for collecting money by force to enjoy life. 'Mirchi' - a girl with a story of her own behind her, lives with Ram and half a dozen members of the dandha, two of whom are girls. Most of the dialogues in these scenes show their wayward behavior and carefree life. Their solutions to problems too are strange. When a girl is gang raped – as the young man pretending love for her takes her to a room to rape her, ten others in the room too rape her - the leader orders that the one who pretended love for the girl to marry her. This he feels will be a punishment for the young man because it would make him suffer as he would recall every day what he had done to her.

There are many such other strange punishments. But not always do the members of the dandha display this kind of social consciousness and sense of justice. They charge huge sums for settling issues. Even the police department and its high officials are at beck and call of this gang. A rival gang starts functioning. They await a chance to wipe off this gang. They get the chance when Viswam falls in love with a girl (Radhika). He is the son of a schoolteacher, respected by persons from all sections of life – right from the police to the bureaucracy. When the police arrest Viswam, the father to get him released, runs from pillar to post only to learn in the end how bad his son is, and how he extracts money from others. He is a disappointed man and dies of a heart attack. The commissioner of police,(Nayaz) also a student of the teacher, helps his son's release. This begins the destruction of the network he works for and his realization that this kind of negative approach would never be acceptable to society.

Cast
Priyadarshini Ram as Ravi 
Bharat as Vishwam 
Radhika Joshi as Naina
K. J. Sharma
Ratna Kumari
Viswendar Reddy
Nayaz Noor

References

External links
Manodu review on The Hindu
News article on Manodu in The Hindu newspaper
Manodu review on Full Hyderabad
Andhracafe review on Manodu
Audience response to Manodu

2000s Telugu-language films
2006 films
2006 directorial debut films